The 2014–15 Liga IV was the 73rd season of the Liga IV, the fourth tier of the Romanian football league system. The champions of each county association play against one from a neighboring county in a playoff to gain promotion.

Promotion play-off 

The matches are scheduled to be played on 20 and 27 June 2015.

|-
||1–1||5–0
||2–1||2–1
||w/o||w/o
||2–0||6–4
||1–1||6–0	
||w/o||w/o
||2–0||5–1
||1–1||6–0
||8–2||3–1
||6–1||3–0
||3–1||2–3
||4–0||8–0
||1–2||1–1
||2–0||3–1
||3–0||3–0
||2–1||2–5
||0–0||0–0
||5–1||1–2
||w/o||w/o
||0–0||2–1
||1–1||3–6
|}

County leagues

Alba County

Arad County

Argeș County

Bacău County

Bihor County

Bistrița-Năsăud County

Botoșani County

Brașov County

Brăila County

Bucharest

Regular season

Seria 1

Seria 2

Championship play-off

Group 1 
All matches were played at Romprim Stadium in Bucharest.

Group 2 
All matches were played at Clinceni Stadium in Clinceni.

Semi-finals

Final 

Chitila won the 2014–15 Liga IV Bucharest and qualify to promotion play-off in Liga III.

Buzău County

Călărași County

Caraș-Severin County

Cluj County

Constanța County

Regular season

East Series

West Series

Championship play-off  
The teams started the play-off with all the records achieved in the regular season and played only against the teams from the other series.

Championship play-out  
The teams started the play-out with all the records achieved in the regular season and played only against the teams from the other series.

Covasna County

Dâmbovița County

Dolj County

Regular season

Championship play-off  
The results between the qualified teams was maintained in the championship play-off.

Championship play-out  
The results between the qualified teams was maintained in the championship play-out.

Galați County

Giurgiu County

South Series

North Series

Championship play-off  
The championship play-off played between the best two ranked teams in each series of the regular season. All matches were played at Marin Anastasovici Stadium in Giurgiu on 9 and 10 June 2015 the semi-finals and on 14 June 2015 the final.

Semi-finals

Final 

Arsenal Malu won the 2014–15 Liga IV Giurgiu County and qualify to promotion play-off in Liga III.

 Gorj County 

 Harghita County 

 Hunedoara County 

 Ialomița County 

 Iași County 

 Ilfov County 
 Seria 1 

 Seria 2 

 Championship play-off  
The Championship play-off will be played between the first two teams from each series of the regular season.
 Semi-finals 

 Final Voluntari II won the 2014–15 Liga IV Ilfov County and qualify to promotion play-off in Liga III. Maramureș County 
 North Series 

 South Series 

 Championship final  
The championship final was played on 6 June 2015 at Viorel Mateianu Stadium in Baia Mare.Comuna Recea won the 2014–15 Liga IV Maramureș County and qualify to promotion play-off in Liga III. Mehedinți County 

 Mureș County 

 Neamț County 

 Championship play-off  
Championship play-off played in a single round-robin tournament between the best four teams of the regular season. The teams started the play-off with the following points: 1st place – 3 points, 2nd place – 2 points, 3rd place – 1 point, 4th place – 0 points.

All matches were played at Cetatea Stadium from Târgu Neamț.

 Olt County 

 Championship play-off  

 Prahova County 

 Satu Mare County 

 Sălaj County 

 Sibiu County 

 Suceava County 

 Teleorman County 

 Timiș County 

 Tulcea County 

 Championship play-off  

 Vaslui County 
 North series 

 South series 

 Championship play-off  

 Vâlcea County 
 North Series 

 South Series 

 Championship play-off  
 Semi-finals 

 Final Flacăra Horezu won the 2014–15 Liga IV Vâlcea County and qualify to promotion play-off in Liga III.''

Vrancea County

Championship play-off

See also 
 2014–15 Liga I
 2014–15 Liga II
 2014–15 Liga III

References

External links
 FRF

Liga IV seasons
4
Romania